The following outline is provided as an overview of and topical guide to Tonga:

Tonga is a sovereign island nation located in the South Pacific Ocean. The islands lie south of Samoa and are about one-third of the way from New Zealand to Hawaii.

Tonga is the only surviving monarchy among the island nations of the Pacific Ocean, as well as being the only island nation never to have been formally colonized.

The islands are also known as  the Friendly Islands because of the friendly reception accorded to Captain Cook on his first visit in 1773.  He happened to arrive at the time of the inasi festival, the yearly donation of the first fruits to the Tu'i Tonga, the islands' paramount chief, and was invited to the festivities. According to the writer William Mariner, in reality the chiefs had wanted to kill Cook during the gathering, but had been unable to agree on a plan.

General reference 

 Pronunciation:
 Common English country name:  Tonga
 Official English country name:  The Kingdom of Tonga
 Common endonym(s): Tonga  
 Official endonym(s): Puleʻanga Fakatuʻi ʻo Tonga  
 Adjectival(s): Tongan
 Demonym(s): Tongan
 Etymology: Name of Tonga
 ISO country codes:  TO, TON, 776
 ISO region codes:  See ISO 3166-2:TO
 Internet country code top-level domain:  .to

Geography of Tonga 

Geography of Tonga
 Tonga is: an island country of 169 islands, 36 of which are inhabited
 Location:
 Southern Hemisphere and Western Hemisphere
 Pacific Ocean
 South Pacific Ocean
 Oceania
 Polynesia
 Time zone:  UTC+13
 Extreme points of Tonga
 High:  unnamed location on Kao Island 
 Low:  South Pacific Ocean 0 m
 Land boundaries:  none
 Coastline:  South Pacific Ocean 419 km
 Population of Tonga: 100,000  - 187th most populous country

 Area of Tonga: 748 km2
 Atlas of Tonga

Environment of Tonga 

 Climate of Tonga
 Renewable energy in Tonga
 Geology of Tonga
 Protected areas of Tonga
 Biosphere reserves in Tonga
 National parks of Tonga
 Wildlife of Tonga
 Fauna of Tonga
 Birds of Tonga
 Mammals of Tonga

Natural geographic features of Tonga 

 Islands of Tonga
 Lakes of Tonga
 Mountains of Tonga
 Volcanoes in Tonga
 Rivers of Tonga
 Waterfalls of Tonga
 Valleys of Tonga
 World Heritage Sites in Tonga: None

Regions of Tonga 

Regions of Tonga

Ecoregions of Tonga 

List of ecoregions in Tonga
 Tongan tropical moist forests

Administrative divisions of Tonga 

Administrative divisions of Tonga
Ha'apai
Tongatapu
Vava'u
 Capital of Tonga: Nukuʻalofa
 Cities of Tonga

Demography of Tonga 

Demographics of Tonga

Government and politics of Tonga 

Politics of Tonga
 Form of government: constitutional monarchy
 Capital of Tonga: Nukuʻalofa
 Elections in Tonga
 Political parties in Tonga

Branches of the government of Tonga 

Government of Tonga

Executive branch of the government of Tonga 
 Head of state: King of Tonga, Tupou VI
 Head of government: Prime Minister of Tonga, Lord Tuʻivakano
 Cabinet of Tonga

Legislative branch of the government of Tonga 
 Legislative Assembly of Tonga (unicameral)

Judicial branch of the government of Tonga 

Court system of Tonga
 Privy Council of Tonga
 Court of Appeal of Tonga (supreme court)

Foreign relations of Tonga 

Foreign relations of Tonga
 Diplomatic missions in Tonga
 Diplomatic missions of Tonga

International organization membership 
The Kingdom of Tonga is a member of:

African, Caribbean, and Pacific Group of States (ACP)
Asian Development Bank (ADB)
Commonwealth of Nations
Food and Agriculture Organization (FAO)
Group of 77 (G77)
International Bank for Reconstruction and Development (IBRD)
International Civil Aviation Organization (ICAO)
International Criminal Police Organization (Interpol)
International Development Association (IDA)
International Federation of Red Cross and Red Crescent Societies (IFRCS)
International Finance Corporation (IFC)
International Fund for Agricultural Development (IFAD)
International Hydrographic Organization (IHO)
International Maritime Organization (IMO)
International Mobile Satellite Organization (IMSO)
International Monetary Fund (IMF)
International Olympic Committee (IOC)
International Red Cross and Red Crescent Movement (ICRM)

International Telecommunication Union (ITU)
International Trade Union Confederation (ITUC)
Organisation for the Prohibition of Chemical Weapons (OPCW)
Pacific Islands Forum (PIF)
Secretariat of the Pacific Community (SPC)
South Pacific Regional Trade and Economic Cooperation Agreement (Sparteca)
United Nations (UN)
United Nations Conference on Trade and Development (UNCTAD)
United Nations Educational, Scientific, and Cultural Organization (UNESCO)
United Nations Industrial Development Organization (UNIDO)
Universal Postal Union (UPU)
World Customs Organization (WCO)
World Federation of Trade Unions (WFTU)
World Health Organization (WHO)
World Intellectual Property Organization (WIPO)
World Meteorological Organization (WMO)
World Trade Organization (WTO)

Law and order in Tonga 

Law of Tonga
 Capital punishment in Tonga
 Constitution of Tonga
 Crime in Tonga
 Human rights in Tonga
 LGBT rights in Tonga
 Freedom of religion in Tonga
 Royal Tonga Police Service

Military of Tonga 

Military of Tonga
 Command
 Commander-in-chief:
 Ministry of Defence of Tonga
 Forces
 Army of Tonga
 Navy of Tonga
 Air Force of Tonga
 Special forces of Tonga
 Military history of Tonga
 Military ranks of Tonga

Local government in Tonga 

Local government in Tonga

History of Tonga 

History of Tonga
 Timeline of the history of Tonga
 Current events of Tonga
 Military history of Tonga

Culture of Tonga 

Culture of Tonga
 Architecture of Tonga
 Cuisine of Tonga
 Festivals in Tonga
 Languages of Tonga
 Media in Tonga
 National symbols of Tonga
 Coat of arms of Tonga
 Flag of Tonga
 National anthem of Tonga
 People of Tonga
 Public holidays in Tonga
 Records of Tonga
 Religion in Tonga
 Christianity in Tonga
 Hinduism in Tonga
 Islam in Tonga
 Judaism in Tonga
 Sikhism in Tonga
 World Heritage Sites in Tonga: None

Art in Tonga 
 Art in Tonga
 Cinema of Tonga
 Literature of Tonga
 Music of Tonga
 Television in Tonga
 Theatre in Tonga

Sports in Tonga 

Sports in Tonga
 Football in Tonga
 Tonga at the Olympics

Economy and infrastructure of Tonga 

Economy of Tonga
 Economic rank, by nominal GDP (2007): 185th (one hundred and eighty fifth)
 Agriculture in Tonga
 Banking in Tonga
 National Bank of Tonga
 Communications in Tonga
 Internet in Tonga
 Companies of Tonga
Currency of Tonga: Pa'anga
ISO 4217: TOP
 Energy in Tonga
 Energy policy of Tonga
 Oil industry in Tonga
 Mining in Tonga
 Tourism in Tonga
 Transport in Tonga

Education in Tonga 

Education in Tonga

Health in Tonga 
Nuku'alofa and Neiafu have hospitals equipped with limited emergency and outpatient facilities. Elsewhere, medical facilities and medications are extremely limited. People with serious medical conditions are typically referred to New Zealand for treatment.

Infrastructure of Tonga 
 Health care in Tonga
 Transportation in Tonga
 Airports in Tonga
 Rail transport in Tonga
 Roads in Tonga
 Water supply and sanitation in Tonga

See also 

Tonga
Index of Tonga-related articles
List of international rankings
List of Tonga-related topics
Member state of the Commonwealth of Nations
Member state of the United Nations
Outline of geography
Outline of Oceania

References

External links 

CIA World Factbook: Tonga
Matangi Tonga - National magazine
Tonga Chamber of Commerce and Industry
Ministry of Finance, Kingdom of Tonga
Ministry of Lands, Survey and Natural Resources, Kingdom of Tonga
National Reserve Bank of Tonga, Kingdom of Tonga
Official Tongan Government Portal

Tonga Legislation
Tonga Coronation of King George Tupou V

Tonga
 1